Boris Becker was the defending champion, but did not participate this year.

Aaron Krickstein won the tournament, beating Carl-Uwe Steeb in the final, 6–2, 6–2.

Seeds

  Stefan Edberg (semifinals)
  Andre Agassi (second round)
  Jakob Hlasek (second round)
  Aaron Krickstein (champion)
  Carl-Uwe Steeb (final)
  Andrés Gómez (second round)
  Kevin Curren (first round)
  Dan Goldie (second round)

Draw

Finals

Top half

Bottom half

References

 Main draw

1989 Grand Prix (tennis)
1989 Singles